
The following is a list of Playboy Playmates of 1985.  Playboy magazine names its Playmate of the Month each month throughout the year.

January

Joan Bennett (born August 30, 1964, in Chicago, Illinois) is a former American model. She was Playboy magazine's Playmate of the Month for January 1985.

February

Cherie Witter (born October 22, 1963) is an American model and actress. She was chosen as Playboy's Playmate of the Month for February 1985.

March

Donna Smith (born March 15, 1960, in Portland, Oregon) is an American model. She was the March 1985 Playboy Playmate of the Month.

April

Cindy Brooks (born November 5, 1951) is an American model and actress. She was chosen as Playboy's Playmate of the Month in April 1985. She briefly held a regular role on Days of Our Lives in 1989.

May

Kathleen Ann Shower (born March 8, 1953) is an American model and actress. Known as Kathy Shower she is Playboy's Playmate of the Month for May 1985 and Playmate of the Year for 1986.

Following Playboy, Shower had an acting career, mainly within the action adventure (American Kickboxer 2, The Further Adventures of Tennessee Buck) and erotic thriller genres (Boundaries, LA Goddess and Velvet Dreams), as well as TV work including a continuing role in Santa Barbara.  In 2009, Shower completed an independent film entitled Kathy Shower: Playmate Model Mom.

June

Devin Renee DeVasquez (born June 25, 1963, in Baton Rouge, Louisiana) is an American model and actress. She was chosen as Playboys Playmate of the Month in June 1985. Her centerfold was photographed by Richard Fegley.

DeVasquez has appeared in over 100 commercials and authored the book The Naked Truth About A Pinup Model. She is married to actor Ronn Moss.

July

Hope Marie Carlton (born March 3, 1966, in Riverhead NY), an American model and actress, was Playboy magazine's Playmate of the Month for the July 1985 issue. She married Robert Keith Levin in 1991; the couple divorced in 2005. She is known for starring in the movies Hard Ticket to Hawaii (1987), Savage Beach (1989) and Bloodmatch (1991), as well as for her cameo in A Nightmare on Elm Street 4 (1988). Some of her later roles are credited to "Hope Levin."

August

Cher Butler (born March 6, 1964) is an American model and actress. She was chosen as Playboy's Playmate of the Month for August 1985. In her only film role, the female lead in Crack House (1989), she was billed as "Cheryl Kay".

September

Venice Kong (born 17 December 1961 in St. Mary, Jamaica) is a Jamaican model and actress of Chinese-Jamaican heritage. She was chosen as Playboys Playmate of the Month in September 1985.

October

Cynthia Brimhall (born March 10, 1964, in Ogden, Utah) is an American model and B-movie actress. She was chosen as Playboys Playmate of the Month in October 1985. She went on to perform in several Andy Sidaris films and appeared on The Price Is Right as one of "Barker's Beauties."

Hers was the first centerfold to appear without the famous staple, as Playboy moved to a new binding method.

November

Pamela Saunders (born July 9, 1963, in Miami) is an American model. She was Playboy magazine's Playmate of the Month for its November 1985 issue.

December

Carol Ficatier de Beaufort (born 20 February 1958 in Auxerre, France) is a French model and actress. She was chosen as Playboy's Playmate of the Month for December 1985.  In 1993, Ficatier moved to Rome, Italy to study art history.

See also
 List of people in Playboy 1980–1989

Notes

References

1985-related lists
1985
Playmates Of 1985